Pseudothonalmus is a genus of beetles in the family Cerambycidae, containing the following species:

 Pseudothonalmus divisus (Chevrolat, 1858)
 Pseudothonalmus major (Gahan, 1895)
 Pseudothonalmus terminalis (White, 1853)
 Pseudothonalmus woodleyi Lingafelter, Micheli & Guerrero, 2004

References

Heteropsini